Bathanthidium barkamense is a species of bee in the family Megachilidae, the leaf-cutter, carder, or mason bees.

References

Megachilidae
Insects described in 1986